Yutahito may refer to:
Emperor Go-Horikawa (1212–1234), 86th emperor of Japan, 1221–1232
Emperor Kōmyō (1322–1380), Ashikaga Pretender, 1336–1348